Sabino High is a public secondary education school located in Tucson, Arizona. Located on the northeast side of the city, it is a part of the Tucson Unified School District. The principal is Kevin Amidan.

History 
The school was established in 1972 in response to the boom of Tucson, Arizona's east side in the 1960s and 1970s. It is named after nearby Sabino Canyon. (Contemporary establishments Santa Rita High School and Sahuaro High School have similar facilities.) Starting with grades 9 and 10, it finally had a full graduating class in 1975. This class chose the school colors purple and gold, and chose Sabercats as the mascot. A committee of freshman at Sahuaro who were going to transfer as sophomores into Sabino came up with the choices put up to a vote of all of the incoming sophomores. The other option was maroon and silver, with the mascot of the Toros. In the early years of the school, a junior high (grades 7 and 8) was located on the same campus.

Sports 
Sabino has a rich sports tradition, mainly in the sport of football. Apart from football Sabino has also won team state championships in volleyball (1989) softball(1991) cheerleading (2004, 2010) golf (1986), baseball (1997), men's (1995, 2005) and women's soccer (1996, 2008), swimming and diving, cross country (2007), and track and field, and individual state titles in wrestling and tennis.

Early years 

Sabino struggled through its first two decades. Coached by Don Holley in their first varsity seasons, the Sabercats struggled for wins, culminating with an 0–20 record in Coach Holley's last two seasons. Those struggles were soon forgotten with the arrival of Arizona high school coaching legend Ollie Mayfield, who had led perennial state championship contenders at Tucson High School. Mayfield instilled a sense of pride and commitment that spurred Sabino to its first playoff game in 1977 against cross town powerhouse Amphi. Mayfield was still quite popular at Tucson High, so end zone bleachers at Rincon High School were added to accommodate the overflow crowd. Sabino lost, but it was the beginning of a superpower football program in Arizona. In 1978, Mayfield led Sabino back to the playoffs where the Sabercats stunned No. 1 ranked Sunnyside 24–7. Sabino advanced to the state playoffs for the first time, but lost to Phoenix Washington 7–3. Mayfield continued with his successes in 1979, again moving the team into the playoffs with a first round win against Tucson's Salpointe Catholic High School, eventually losing in the quarterfinals to the Mesa Jackrabbits in a hard-fought game at Westwood High School in Mesa. Those teams generated several All-Star, All-City and All-State selections, thus creating the foundation for those who would follow. Mayfield had set Sabino well on the path of its winning ways with 3-year totals of 23 wins and 12 losses, the latter being primarily attributed to his first season.

1990s 

The arrival of coach Jeff Scurran marked the beginning of an era and set in motion the transformation of Sabino into a football powerhouse. This transformation was sometimes literal, as seen with the 1989 alteration of the auto repair garage (a classroom for a popular Sabino course) into an  state-of-the-art strength and conditioning facility (See Keys to Success). Many saw this investment as a sign that the school and community was ready to commit to winning.

Scurran took over a 2-win Sabino team and turned the Sabercats into a three-time state champion (1990, 1992 and 1998) and led the team to the final four or better in nine of his 12 seasons while posting a 127-26-1 record. In 1999, the Arizona Interscholastic Association reclassified the school as 5A due to enrollment growth. That year they became the first team in state history to move up a class and make the state title game in the same year.

Rivalry with Sahuaro 

Sabino first beat Sahuaro in football in 1978, 35–7, mainly due to the dual-100+ yard rushing attack of Dion Toumey and Joe Gartrell. From that point on, Sabino and Sahuaro were bitter rivals.

During Sabino's decade of dominance the Sabercats renewed their rivalry with east side neighbor Sahuaro High School. Sahuaro won the state championship in 1994. In 1996 the game was moved to the Thursday before opening day. Labeled "The Desert Kickoff Classic", it was the first Arizona varsity game played every year and regularly drew the largest crowd during the regular season.

In 1997 Sabino steamrolled their way into the state quarterfinals with a 12–0 record. Sahuaro on the other hand had to claw their way to the quarterfinals, making it there with an 8–4 record. The two teams met on a late October Friday night at standing-room-only Rincon High School. Earlier in the year Sabino clobbered the Cougars 38–7, adding even more hype on the biggest quarterfinal game Tucson had ever hosted. The Cougars came out quickly building a 14–0 lead, but Sabino came back to tie the game at half 28–28. In the third quarter Sabino's first play from scrimmage resulted in a 75-yard touchdown run, putting the Sabercats up 35–28. Sahuaro fought back to tie it once more at 35, but eventually ran out of steam in the 4th quarter losing 49–35 at the end.

Rebuilding 

After their dominance in the 1990s, Sabino began a new decade with a new coach. Doug Holland, a longtime assistant under Scurran, led the 5-A Sabercats to a respectable 7–3 record, however the team missed the playoffs for the first time in 9 years. 2000 also marked the end of the Sabercats conference winning streak at 42 games in a row. Holland stepped down after one season and the Sabercats were left without a coach. In 2001, Gary Buer was hired to take over and rebuild Sabino's program. After two seasons, Buer left the Sabercats to build a new college football program at a small, private liberal arts college in Virginia. With new head coach Jay Campos and a realignment back to the 4A Conference, Sabino brought the program back to elite level status. In 2005 they made it back to the state title game for the first time in 6 years but lost to Glendale's Cactus High School. In 2006, while compiling a 12–2 record, the Sabercats again reached the state championship game but fell to Scottsdale's Saguaro High School at then-new University of Phoenix Stadium. In 2009, Sabino made it to the State Championship game again but fell short to Canyon del Oro High School.

State Football records 

Sabino High School holds the division 4A record for most shutouts in a season, with 8 in 1990. They finished that season 14-0 and won the state championship. It also holds the record for most interceptions in a season by any team in the state (at any level) with 40 in 1989 and again in 1992. In 1992 they again went 14–0 and won the state championship.

Notable alumni
Carrie Gerlach Cecil, American author and businessperson 
J. J. Hardy, Major League Baseball shortstop
Jonathan Paton, candidate for the U.S. House of Representatives
Brooks Reed, NFL linebacker
Robert Sarver, owner of the Phoenix Suns

References

External links 
 Official website
 Sabino Band

Public high schools in Arizona
Educational institutions established in 1972